A vendor log is a log book or a sign in sheet used by retailers, warehouses, distributors and others in the retail trade. Typically vendor logs are used in retailers to keep track of when vendor visitors come into the store to perform retail work. This work could include merchandising, demo work or training sessions.

Vendor logs are also used in warehouses, at corporate offices, government buildings etc. The purpose is to track what vendor visited the business, what time they entered and exited and the purpose of the visit. This helps to accomplish two things: to keep a record for the business and to help audit visits by the upper level management of the vendor company.

Retail processes and techniques
Retailing equipment and supplies